Cochylimorpha clathrana is a species of moth of the family Tortricidae. It is found in Ukraine and Russia.

The wingspan is 16–20 mm. Adults have been recorded on wing in May.

References

Moths described in 1871
Cochylimorpha
Moths of Europe